Echites is a genus of flowering plants in the family Apocynaceae, first described as a genus in 1756. It is primarily native to Mexico, Central America, the West Indies, and the US State of Florida.

Species
Over 500 names have been published for species, subspecies, and varieties within Echites, but most have been relegated to synonymy or moved to other genera. The following are currently accepted
 Echites agglutinatus Jacq. - Cuba, Hispaniola, Jamaica, Puerto Rico, Leeward Islands
 Echites brevipedunculatus Lippold - Cuba
 Echites cajalbanicus Lippold - Cuba
 Echites candelarianus J.F.Morales - Costa Rica
 Echites darienensis J.F.Morales - Panama
 Echites puntarenensis J.F.Morales - Guatemala, Honduras, El Salvador, Nicaragua, Costa Rica 
 Echites turbinatus Woodson - Chiapas, Costa Rica, Honduras, Panama
 Echites tuxtlensis Standl. - Chiapas, Yucatán Peninsula, Belize, Guatemala, El Salvador, Honduras 
 Echites umbellatus Jacq. - Tabasco, Yucatán Peninsula, Belize, Honduras, Cayman Islands, Cuba, Hispaniola, Jamaica, Leeward Islands, Bahamas, Florida, Turks & Caicos Islands, Colombian islands in the Western Caribbean 
 Echites woodsonianus Monach. - Michoacán, Guerrero, Chiapas, Guatemala, Honduras, Nicaragua, Costa Rica 
 Echites yucatanensis Millsp. ex Standl. - Belize, Guatemala, Nicaragua, Honduras, El Salvador, Jalisco, Guerrero, Tabasco, Yucatán Peninsula

References

Apocynaceae genera
Echiteae